Rezonville is a former commune in the Moselle department in Grand Est in north-eastern France. On 1 January 2019, it was merged into the new commune Rezonville-Vionville.

See also

 Communes of the Moselle department
 Parc naturel régional de Lorraine

References

Former communes of Moselle (department)
Populated places disestablished in 2019